Chełm is a village in the administrative district of Gmina Lidzbark Warmiński, within Lidzbark County, Warmian-Masurian Voivodeship, in northern Poland. It is located in the historic region of Warmia.

References

Villages in Lidzbark County